Barhoumi is a surname common in north Africa. Notable people with the surname include:

Issam Barhoumi (born 1978), Tunisian martial artist
Jasmina Barhoumi (born 2002), German-born Tunisian footballer
Sufyian Barhoumi (born 1973), Algerian Guantanamo detainee

Surnames of African origin